Sittichai Suwonprateep (born November 17, 1980 in Samut Prakan) is a track and field sprint athlete who competes internationally for Thailand and is a naval officer with the Royal Thai Navy.

Suwonprateep represented Thailand at the 2008 Summer Olympics in Beijing. He competed at the 4x100 metres relay together with Siriroj Darasuriyong, Sompote Suwannarangsri and Apinan Sukaphai. In their qualification heat they placed fifth in a time of 39.40 seconds and they were eliminated.

Competition record

References

1980 births
Living people
Sittichai Suwonprateep
Sittichai Suwonprateep
Athletes (track and field) at the 2000 Summer Olympics
Athletes (track and field) at the 2008 Summer Olympics
Asian Games medalists in athletics (track and field)
Athletes (track and field) at the 2002 Asian Games
Athletes (track and field) at the 2006 Asian Games
Athletes (track and field) at the 2010 Asian Games
Universiade medalists in athletics (track and field)
Sittichai Suwonprateep
Sittichai Suwonprateep
Southeast Asian Games medalists in athletics
Sittichai Suwonprateep
Sittichai Suwonprateep
Sittichai Suwonprateep
Medalists at the 2002 Asian Games
Medalists at the 2010 Asian Games
Medalists at the 2006 Asian Games
Competitors at the 2003 Southeast Asian Games
Competitors at the 2005 Southeast Asian Games
Competitors at the 2007 Southeast Asian Games
Competitors at the 2009 Southeast Asian Games
Universiade gold medalists for Thailand
Competitors at the 2005 Summer Universiade
Medalists at the 2007 Summer Universiade
Sittichai Suwonprateep
Sittichai Suwonprateep
Sittichai Suwonprateep